Raisner is a surname. Notable people with the surname include: 

Albert Raisner (1922–2011), French harmonica player
Craig Raisner (1961–2018), American voice actor, composer, writer and film/television producer
Kim Raisner (born 1972), German modern pentathlete and coach

See also
Rainer (surname)